Phil Goodlad is a Scottish television and radio sports reporter currently working for the BBC. He is from Yell in the Shetland Islands. He is usually on heard on Good Morning Scotland and also appears on Reporting Scotland as sports correspondent. He previously worked for local Orkney and Shetland radio stations.

During his time as golf correspondent, he was once cut off mid-sentence in the first of a series of technical problems which later led to Reporting Scotland presenter Sally Magnusson losing composure on air. He also loves an oooohhh matron

References 

BBC sports presenters and reporters
People from Yell, Shetland
Living people
Year of birth missing (living people)